James Clarence Inzer (March 5, 1887 – December 20, 1967) was an American politician who served as the 16th Lieutenant Governor of Alabama from 1947 to 1951.

References

External links
Biography  by the Alabama Department of Archives & History

Lieutenant Governors of Alabama
1887 births
1967 deaths
Alabama Democrats
20th-century American politicians